Anthony Victor Endersby Gould (born 22 February 1944) is an English former first-class cricketer.

Gould was born at Windsor in February 1944 and later studied at Fitzwilliam College, Cambridge. While studying at Cambridge, he played first-class cricket for Cambridge University Cricket Club between 1964 and 1966, making 13 appearances, with 12 of his appearances coming in 1966. Playing as a middle order batsman in the Cambridge side, he scored 241 runs at an average of 10.04, with a highest score of 38.

References

External links

1944 births
Living people
People from Windsor, Berkshire
Alumni of Fitzwilliam College, Cambridge
English cricketers
Cambridge University cricketers